The Italian Connection (also released as Manhunt in the City and Manhunt in Milan) is a 1972 italian noir-thriller film co-written and directed by Fernando Di Leo; starring Mario Adorf, Henry Silva, Woody Strode, Adolfo Celi, Luciana Paluzzi, Sylva Koscina, and Cyril Cusack. It is the second part of Di Leo’s “Milieu trilogy”, preceded by Caliber 9 (also 1972) and followed by The Boss (1973).

Plot 
Professional hitmen Dave Catania and Frank Webster are dispatched from New York to Milan to find and kill Luca Canali, a small-time pimp accused of stealing a mob heroin shipment. Local mafia Don Vito Tressoldi is upset by the Americans intrusion on his turf, but is forced to play along by collecting Canali for them. Don Vito deploys a city-wide network of spies and informants to find Canali, but he manages to narrowly evade them, even as his own friends turn on him.

It transpires that Don Vito actually stole the shipment himself and framed Canali. He resorts to having Canali’s wife and daughter killed to draw him out. Enraged, Canali goes on a violent rampage of revenge against the mob, picking off the members of Don Vito’s gang and eventually killing the boss himself in his own office. He leads Catania and Webster to a final confrontation in a wrecking yard, where he manages to kill them both but is severely wounded in the process. Exhausted, Canali collapses, leaving it ambiguous if he survives or not.

Cast

Production
Di Leo's original title for The Italian Connection was Ordini da un altro mondo (Orders From Another World). The film's premise is taken from the short story "Milan by Calibro 9" by Giorgio Scerbanenco, which had appeared in the book Milano calibro 9, the inspiration for di Leo's earlier film of the same name; unlike the previous film, Scerbanenco did not receive an onscreen credit.

The film was shot at Dear Studios in Rome and on-location in Milan. Mario Adorf performed his own stunts in the infamous car chase scene. In contrast to Caliber 9, Adorf also provided his own voice for the English-language dub. Co-stars Adolfo Celi and Luciana Paluzzi had previously appeared together in the James Bond film Thunderball (1965).

Release
The Italian Connection was released theatrically in Italy on 2 September 1972 where it was distributed by Alpherat. The film grossed 852.404 million Italian lira on its theatrical run in Italy. It was released in West Germany on 1 December 1972 under the title Der Mafiaboss - Sie töten wie Schakale.

The film received a release in the United States as The Italian Connection in 1973 with an 87-minute running time. Various home video releases over the years retitled the film as Hired to Kill, Black Kingpin, Hitmen, and Hit Men.

The film was released by Raro on DVD and Blu-ray in the United States.

Legacy
Quentin Tarantino, a self-avowed fan of Di Leo’s films, cited the characters of Dave and Frank as the inspirations for Vincent Vega (John Travolta) and Jules Winfield (Samuel L. Jackson) in Pulp Fiction.

References

Footnotes

Sources

External links 

 

Poliziotteschi films
1970s action thriller films
1970s crime thriller films
1972 films
Films about organized crime in Italy
Films based on works by Giorgio Scerbanenco
Films directed by Fernando Di Leo
Films scored by Armando Trovajoli
Films set in Milan
Films shot in Milan
Films shot in Rome
Italian gangster films
Italian crime thriller films
Italian action thriller films
West German films
German gangster films
German crime thriller films
German action thriller films
English-language Italian films
English-language German films
1970s Italian-language films
1970s Italian films
1970s German films